Events from the year 1989 in the United Kingdom.

Incumbents
 Monarch – Elizabeth II
 Prime Minister – Margaret Thatcher (Conservative)
 Parliament – 50th

Events

January
 4 January – A memorial service is held for the 270 people who died in the Lockerbie air disaster two weeks ago. Margaret Thatcher and several other world political leaders are among more than 200 people present in the church service at the village of Old Dryfesdale near Lockerbie.
 8 January – 44 people are killed in the Kegworth air disaster.
 11 January
 Accident investigators say that the Kegworth air disaster was caused when pilot Kevin Hunt, who survived the crash, accidentally shut down the wrong engine.
 Abbey National building society offers free shares to its 5,500,000 members.
 14 January – Muslims demonstrate in Bradford against The Satanic Verses, a book written by Salman Rushdie, burning copies of the book in the city streets.
 19 January – Unemployment fell by 66,000 in December, to a nine-year low of just over 2 million. It was last at this level in 1980.
 25 January – John Cleese wins a libel case after the Daily Mirror described him as having become like his character Basil Fawlty in the sitcom Fawlty Towers.

February
 5 February – At 6.00pm, the world's first commercial DBS system, Sky Television goes on air. Three new services – Sky News, Sky Movies and Eurosport – with the fourth being Sky Channel.
 11 February – ITV airs the first episode of Home and Away, an Australian soap which was launched in its homeland last year.
 12 February – Belfast lawyer Pat Finucane is murdered by the Ulster Defence Association.
 14 February – Ayatollah Ruhollah Khomeini of Iran places a fatwa (order to kill) on author Salman Rushdie following the publication of his controversial book The Satanic Verses, which has caused outrage among the Islamic community of Britain.
 19 February – The Industrial Society offices at 3 Carlton House Terrace in London is severely damaged by fire.
 20 February – Clive Barracks bombing: A Provisional Irish Republican Army bomb attack damages Clive Barracks in Shropshire.
 23 February
 27-year-old William Hague wins the Richmond (North Yorkshire) by-election for the Conservative Party following the departure of Leon Brittan to the European Commission.
 Den Watts, the hugely popular character played by Leslie Grantham in the BBC's soap opera EastEnders, departs from the series (which he joined at its inception four years ago) as the character is presumably killed in an episode watched by over 20 million viewers.

March
 4 March – Purley rail crash: two trains collide at Purley, Surrey killing six people.
 6 March – Two people are killed in the Glasgow Bellgrove rail accident.
 7 March – Iran breaks off diplomatic relations with the UK over Salman Rushdie's controversial book The Satanic Verses.
 16 March – Unemployment is now below 7% for the first time in eight years, but still remains marginally over 2 million.
 17 March – The three men convicted of murdering paperboy Carl Bridgewater in Staffordshire 10 years ago have their appeals rejected. A fourth man convicted in connection with the killing died in prison in 1981.
 20 March – Chief Superintendent Harry Breen and Superintendent Bob Buchanan of the Royal Ulster Constabulary are killed by the IRA.
 26 March – Nigel Mansell wins the Brazilian Grand Prix.

April
 5 April – 500 workers on the Channel Tunnel go on strike in a protest against pay and working conditions.
 6 April – The government announces an end to the legislation which effectively guarantees secure work for more than 9,000 dockers over the remainder of their working lives.
 10 April – Nick Faldo becomes the first English winner of the Masters Tournament.
 14 April – Ford launches the third generation of its Fiesta, the first to offer a 5-door version which is being built at the Dagenham plant in England and the Valencia plant in Spain.
 15 April – 94 people were killed that day in the Hillsborough disaster during the FA Cup semi-final at the Hillsborough Stadium in Sheffield during the FA Cup semi-final between Nottingham Forest FC and Liverpool F.C.; three more will die later of serious injuries received and around 300 others are hospitalized. The death toll is the worst of any sporting disaster in Britain. The youngest victim is a 10-year-old boy, the oldest is 67-year-old Gerard Baron, brother of the late former Liverpool player Kevin Baron.
 16 April – Denis Howell, a former Labour sports minister, urges for the FA Cup final to go ahead this season despite consideration by the Football Association for it to be cancelled due to the Hillsborough disaster.
 17 April – Home Secretary Douglas Hurd announces plans to make all-seater stadiums compulsory for all Football League First Division clubs to reduce the risk of a repeat of the Hillsborough tragedy.
 18 April
 The European Commission accuses Britain of failing to meet standards on drinking water.
 The Hillsborough disaster claims its 95th victim when 14-year-old Lee Nicol dies in hospital as a result of his injuries. He had been visited in hospital by Diana, Princess of Wales, hours before he died.
 Tottenham Hotspur remove perimeter fencing from their White Hart Lane stadium as the first step towards avoiding a repeat of the Hillsborough disaster in English football.
 19 April
 The Sun newspaper sparks outrage on Merseyside about the Hillsborough Disaster with an article entitled "The Truth", supported by South Yorkshire police and locally based news agencies, which claims that spectators robbed and injured dead spectators, and attacked police officers when they were helping the injured and dying. Other newspapers including the Daily Star and Daily Mirror, as well as several regional newspapers, have also printed similar allegations.
 Channel Tunnel workers end their 14-day strike.
 20 April
 The London Underground is at virtual standstill for a day as most of the workers go on strike in protest against plans for driver-only operated trains.
 A MORI poll shows Conservative and Labour support equal at 41%.
 24 April – The BBC's Ceefax teletext is only running as a partial service today due to a strike by broadcasting unions.
 27 April – Security Service Act for the first time places MI5 on a statutory basis.
 28 April
 John Cannan, of Sutton Coldfield, is sentenced to life imprisonment with a recommendation that he should never be released after being found guilty of murdering one woman and sexually assaulting two others.
 Fourteen Liverpool fans are convicted of manslaughter and receive prison sentences of up to three years in Brussels, Belgium, in connection with the Heysel disaster at the 1985 European Cup Final in which 39 spectators (most of them Italian) died. A further eleven Liverpool fans are cleared.

May
 1–3 May – 54 prisoners stage a three-day protest on the roof of Risley Detention Centre before giving themselves up.
 4 May – Margaret Thatcher completes ten years as Prime Minister – the first British Prime Minister of the 20th century to do so.
 5 May – The Vale of Glamorgan constituency in South Wales is seized by the Labour Party in a by-election after 38 years of Conservative control.
 8 May – More than 3,000 British Rail employees launch an unofficial overtime ban, walking out in protest at the end of their eight-hour shifts.
 14 May – A public inquiry, headed by Lord Justice Taylor of Gosforth, begins into the Hillsborough disaster.
 18 May – Unemployment is now below 2,000,000 for the first time since 1980. The Conservative government's joy at tackling unemployment is, however, marred by the findings of a MORI poll which shows Labour slightly ahead of them for the first time in almost three years.
 19 May – Walshaw Dean Lodge, West Yorkshire, enters the UK Weather Records with the Highest 120-min total rainfall at 193 mm. As of July 2006 this record still stands.
 20 May – Liverpool win the FA Cup final with a 3–2 victory over their Merseyside rivals Everton. It is the second all-Merseyside cup final in four seasons, and as happened in 1986, Ian Rush is on the scoresheet for Liverpool twice. Liverpool have won the trophy four times now.
 24 May
 Sonia Sutcliffe, wife of "Yorkshire Ripper" Peter Sutcliffe, is awarded £600,000 in High Court damages against the satirical magazine Private Eye.
 A police raid on a suspected drugs operation at a public house in the Heath Town district of Wolverhampton, leads to a riot in which up to 500 people throw missiles and petrol bombs at police officers.
 26 May – Arsenal win the First Division league title against Liverpool, with a goal from Michael Thomas in the last minute of the last game of the season. Arsenal have now been league champions 9 times but until now hadn't been league champions for 18 years.
 30 May – Passport office staff in Liverpool begin an indefinite strike in protest against staffing levels.

June
 13 June – The sixteenth James Bond film, Licence to Kill, premieres in London. The first Bond film to not use or paraphrase the title of an Ian Fleming story, it is also the second and final film to star Timothy Dalton as the fictional spy.
 19 June – Labour wins 45 of Britain's 78 European Parliament constituencies in the European elections, with the Conservatives gaining 32 seats. The Green Party of England and Wales gains 2,300,000 votes (15% of the vote) but fails to gain a single seat. This is the first national election won by the Labour Party since its last general election win 15 years ago.
 22 June
 Police arrest 260 people celebrating the summer solstice at Stonehenge.
 London Underground workers stage their second one-day strike of the year.
 24 June – A riot takes place in Dewsbury.

July
 1 July – Fears of a property market downturn are heightened when it is reported that many homeowners looking to move are cutting the asking price of their homes by up to 20% in an attempt to speed up the sale of their property, following the property boom of the last 3 years where the price of many homes doubled at the very least.
 2 July – An IRA bomb kills a British soldier in Hanover, West Germany.
 10 July – House prices in the south of England have fallen for the second successive quarter, but are continuing to rise in Scotland as well as the north of England.
 11 July – Britain's dock workers go on strike in protest against the abolition of the Dock Labour Scheme.
 13 July – The fall in unemployment continues, with the tally now standing at slightly over 1,800,000 – the lowest in nearly a decade.
 17 July – 1,500 British tourists are delayed for up to eight hours by French air traffic control strikes.
 19 July – The BBC programme Panorama accuses Shirley Porter, Conservative Leader of Westminster City Council, of gerrymandering.
 20 July – Labour's lead in the opinion polls has increased substantially, with the latest MORI poll putting them nine points ahead of the Conservatives on 45%.
 25 July – The Princess of Wales opens the Landmark Aids Centre, a day centre for people with AIDS, in London.
 28 July – The industrial action by British Rail drivers is reported to be coming to an end as most of the train drivers have ended their overtime ban.

August
 1 August – Charlotte Hughes of Marske-by-the-Sea in Cleveland, believed to be the oldest living person in England, celebrates her 112th birthday.
 4 August – David Duckenfield, the chief superintendent who took control of the FA Cup semi-final game where the Hillsborough disaster occurred on 15 April this year, is suspended from duty on full pay after an inquiry by Lord Justice Taylor blames him for the tragedy in which 95 people died. Two victims of the tragedy, Andrew Devine (aged 22) and Tony Bland (aged 19) are still unconscious in hospital.
 5 August – A train derails near West Ealing station in London, but the passengers escape without serious injuries.
 14 August – The West Midlands Police Serious Crime Squad is disbanded when 50 CID detectives are transferred or suspended after repeated allegations that the force has fabricated confessions.
 17 August – Introduction of electronic tagging to monitor and supervise crime suspects.
 18 August – Manchester United chairman Martin Edwards agrees to sell the club to Michael Knighton for £10million.
 20 August – 51 people are killed in the Marchioness disaster.
 26 August – Betteshanger, the last colliery in Kent, closes, signalling the end of the Kent Coalfield after 93 years.
 29 August – Stone-throwing youths cause mayhem at the Notting Hill Carnival in London, in which many innocent bystanders are injured.
 30 August – The National Trust's house at Uppark in West Sussex is severely damaged by fire.
 31 August – Buckingham Palace confirms that The Princess Royal and Captain Mark Phillips are separating after 16 years of marriage.

September
 2 September – Economy experts warn that a recession could soon be about to hit the United Kingdom. This would be the second recession in a decade.
 7 September – Heidi Hazell, the 26-year-old wife of a British soldier, is shot dead in Dortmund, West Germany.
 8 September – The IRA admits responsibility for the murder of Heidi Hazell. The act is condemned as "evil and cowardly" by British Prime Minister Margaret Thatcher and as "the work of a psychopath" by Opposition Leader Neil Kinnock.
 12 September – 19,000 ambulance crew members across Britain go on strike.
 15 September – SLDP leader Paddy Ashdown addresses his party's annual conference in Brighton with a vow to "end Thatcherism" and achieve a long-term aim of getting the SLDP into power.
 22 September – Eleven people are killed in the Deal barracks bombing.
 27 September – David Owen, leader of the Social Democratic Party "rump" which rejected a merger with the Social and Liberal Democrats, admits that his party is no longer a national force.
 29 September – House prices in London have fallen by 3.8% since May, and are now 16% lower than they were at the height of the property boom last year.

October
 2 October – Three clergy from the British Council of Protestants cause a disturbance at an Anglican church service in Rome at which the Archbishop of Canterbury Robert Runcie is preaching in protest at his suggestion that the Pope could become the spiritual leader of a united church, while Ian Paisley joins protests outside the service.
 8 October – The latest CBI findings spark fear of a recession.
 10 October – The World Wrestling Federation holds its first UK event, at the London Arena.
 11 October
 The Rover Group, Britain's largest independent carmaker, launches its new medium-sized hatchback, the second generation 200 Series which replaces the small four-door saloon of the same name and gives buyers a more modern and upmarket alternative to the ongoing Maestro range which has declined in popularity recently.
 The England national football team qualifies for next Summer's FIFA World Cup in Italy when drawing 0–0 with Poland in Warsaw.
 12 October – Michael Knighton drops his bid to buy Manchester United.
 15 October – Recession fears deepen as stock market prices continue to fall dramatically.
 16 October – The Social and Liberal Democrats, formed last year from the merger of the Social Democratic Party and Liberal Party, are renamed the Liberal Democrats.
 19 October
 The Guildford Four are released from prison after the High Court quashes their convictions for the 1975 terrorist atrocity.
 Labour now has a 10-point lead over the Conservatives in the last MORI poll, with 48% of the vote.
 23 October – The police force are now taking medical emergency 999 calls in London due to the ongoing strike by ambulance crews.
 26 October – Nigel Lawson resigns as Chancellor of the Exchequer; replaced by John Major, while Douglas Hurd becomes Foreign Secretary.
 31 October – British Rail announces that the proposed high-speed rail link to the Channel Tunnel is being postponed for at least one more year.

November
 4 November – First showing of the clay animation film A Grand Day Out, introducing the characters Wallace and Gromit, at a film festival in Bristol.
 7 November – General Assembly of the Church of England votes to allow ordination of women.
 8 November – British Army and Royal Air Force troops are now manning London's ambulance services as the regular ambulance crews are still on strike.
 10 November – Margaret Thatcher visits Berlin the day after the fall of the Berlin Wall, which brings the reunification of Germany forward after Germans were allowed to travel between West and East Berlin for the first time since the wall was built in 1961, and between West and East Germany for the first time since the partition of the country after the war.
 14 November – The Merry Hill Shopping Centre on the Dudley Enterprise Zone in the West Midlands becomes fully operational with the opening of the final shopping mall. The development, which now employs around 6,000 people, first opened to retailers four years ago with several retail warehousing units, and has gradually expanded to become Europe's largest indoor shopping centre. Construction has now begun on the Waterfront office and leisure complex, also within the Enterprise Zone and overlooking the shopping centre, which will open to its first tenants next year. On 7 November, Don and Roy Richardson, the Centre's developers, had announced plans to build the world's tallest building – a 2,000-foot tower including a hotel and nightclub – on land adjacent to the shopping complex; this never takes place.
 16 November – Children Act alters the law in regard to children in England and Wales; in particular, it introduces the notion of parental responsibility in access and custody matters.
 21 November
 The House of Commons is televised live for the first time.
 Nigel Martyn, 23, becomes Britain's first £1million goalkeeper when he is transferred from Bristol Rovers to Crystal Palace.
 23 November – 69-year-old backbencher Sir Anthony Meyer challenges Margaret Thatcher's leadership of the Conservative Party, reportedly fearing that the party will lose the next general election after falling behind Labour in several recent opinion polls. Her leadership has never been challenged before in almost 15 years as party leader, more than 10 of which have been spent as prime minister.
 30 November – Russell Shankland and Dean Hancock, serving eight-year prison sentences for the manslaughter of taxi driver David Wilkie in South Wales during the miners strike, are released from prison on the fifth anniversary of the crime.

December
 December
 The M42 motorway is completed when the final section opens, giving the town of Bromsgrove in Worcestershire (some 10 miles south of Birmingham) a direct link with the M5. Also completed this month is the section of the M40 between Warwick and the interchange with the M42 just south of Solihull. The rest of the M40, between Warwick and Oxford, will open next winter.
 Last coypu in the wild in Britain is trapped in East Anglia.
 The Beer Orders restrict the number of tied pubs that can be owned by large brewery groups to two thousand and require large brewer landlords to allow a guest ale to be sourced by tenants from someone other than their landlord.
 3 December
 Margaret Thatcher, along with American president George Bush and Soviet leader Mikhail Gorbachev, declare the end of the Cold War after over 40 years.
 9,000 workers at British carmaker Vauxhall threaten to go on strike – a move which could end Britain's hopes of becoming to a £200million engine plant for General Motors.
 A new-look Band Aid forms for a new version of the Do They Know It's Christmas? charity single for African famine relief.
 5 December – Margaret Thatcher defeats Anthony Meyer in a leadership election for the Conservative Party, but 60 MPs do not vote for her.
 6 December – the original run of Doctor Who is ended by the BBC after 26 years.
 8 December – ITV attracts a new record audience of nearly 27,000,000 for the episode of Coronation Street in which Alan Bradley (Mark Eden) is fatally run over by a Blackpool tram.
 12 December – Shares in newly privatised regional water industry utility companies (including the largest, Thames Water) achieve premiums of up to 68% in the first day of trading on the Stock Exchange.
 18 December
 The Labour Party abandons its policy on closed shops.
 The second phase of the M40 motorway, linking north Oxfordshire with the Warwickshire/Worcestershire border on the outskirts of the West Midlands conurbation, is opened. The final phase, which links this new motorway with the original London-Oxford section, is due to open within the next year.
 23 December – Band Aid II gain the Christmas Number One with their charity record. 5 years ago, the original Band Aid single reached number 1 and achieved the highest sales of any single ever released in the UK.
 24 December – The iconic British Airways Face advert is first aired. It was made by advertising firm Saatchi & Saatchi, having been written by Graham Fink and Jeremy Clarke, with Hugh Hudson as director which also often considered to became a television commercial classic.
 27 December – SDP leader David Owen predicts another 10 years of Conservative rule, despite Neil Kinnock's Labour Party having a seven-point lead over the Conservatives with 46% of the vote in the final MORI poll of the decade.
 30 December – 22 people involved in the Lockerbie disaster are among those recognised in the New Year's Honours list, while there are knighthoods for former Liberal leader David Steel and the actress Maggie Smith becomes a Dame. Recipients of sporting honours include the boxer Frank Bruno and the golfer Tony Jacklin, both of whom are credited with MBEs.

Undated
 Inflation increases significantly this year, standing at 7.8% – the highest for seven years.
 Fears of a recession are deepened by the economy's overall growth rate dropping to 1.7%, the lowest since 1981.
 House prices in London fall to an average of £86,800 this year – a 10% decrease on the 1988 average.
 After spending most of the decade closed down, Whiteleys in London reopens as a shopping centre.
 Remains of The Rose and Globe Theatre discovered in London.
 Permanent gates are installed across Downing Street in London by the end of the year.
 Red kites reintroduced to England and Scotland.
 A record of more than 2.3 million new cars are sold in Britain this year. The Ford Escort is Britain's best selling car for the eighth year running, managing more than 180,000 sales, while the Volkswagen Golf is Britain's most popular foreign car with well over 50,000 sales. Ford achieves the largest sales of any carmaker in Britain for the 15th year in a row, helped by the launch of the third-generation Fiesta in April while Vauxhall has now overtaken the Rover Group as Britain's second best selling carmaker. The UK new car sales record has been broken six times in the last seven years.
Britain experiences its worst flu epidemic since the winter of 1975–76, with cases peaking in mid-November. Over a million infections are recorded by December, with an increase in flu-related deaths, while hospitals are forced to cancel surgery.

Publications
 Iain Banks' novel Canal Dreams.
 Julian Barnes' novel A History of the World in 10½ Chapters.
 Julie Burchill's novel Ambition.
 William Golding's novel Fire Down Below, third in the To the Ends of the Earth trilogy.
 Roger Penrose's book The Emperor's New Mind: Concerning Computers, Minds and The Laws of Physics.
 Terry Pratchett's Discworld novels Pyramids and Guards! Guards!; and The Bromeliad novel Truckers.
 Rose Tremain's novel Restoration

Births

 3 January 
 Alex Hales, cricketer
 Anthony Wordsworth, footballer
 6 January – Andy Carroll, English footballer  
 9 January – Jordan Turner, English rugby league player
 11 January – Chris Perry-Metcalf, actor
 13 January – Matt Stokoe, English actor
 21 January – Katie Griffiths, actress
 26 January 
 Hannah Arterton, actress
 Imogen Cairns, gymnast  
 27 January – Daisy Lowe, fashion model
 28 January – Carly Paoli, mezzo-soprano
 7 February – Louisa Lytton, English actress and dancer
 8 February – Dani Harmer, actress
 17 February – Rebecca Adlington, Olympic gold medal-winning swimmer
 24 February – Daniel Kaluuya, actor and screenwriter
 27 February
 Lloyd Rigby, footballer
 Sam Sweeney, folk musician
 2 March – Nathalie Emmanuel, actress
 13 March  
 Peaches Geldof, performer (d. 2014)
 Harry Melling, English actor
 16 March – Theo Walcott, footballer
 21 March – Rochelle Humes, singer and TV presenter
 25 March – Scott Sinclair, English footballer
 26 March – Sam Pepper, internet personality
 28 March – David Goodwillie, Scottish footballer
 5 April – Lily James, English actress
 19 April – Sam Tordoff, racing driver
 22 April
 Catherine Banner, author
 James McClean, Northern Irish footballer
 21 May – Kate Phillips, actress
 31 May – Sean Thornley, tennis player
 8 June – Richard Fleeshman, actor
 12 June – Dale Stephens, footballer
 23 June – Lauren Bennett, singer, dancer, painter, photographer and model 
 26 June – Magid Magid, Somali-born British politician and activist 
 1 July
Mitch Hewer, actor 
Hannah Murray, actress
2 July – Tom Zanetti, DJ and rapper
 11 July – Aden Flint, footballer
 16 July – Gareth Bale, Welsh footballer
 21 July
 Juno Temple, actress
 Jamie Waylett, actor
 23 July – Daniel Radcliffe, actor (Harry Potter films)
 9 August – Lucy Dixon, English actress
 20 August – Judd Trump, snooker player
 21 August – Rob Knox, English actor (died 2008)  
 1 September – Daniel Sturridge, footballer
 7 September 
 Holly Colvin, cricketer
 Hugh Mitchell, actor
 22 September – Michael Heaver, English politician, MEP
 25 September – Vick Hope, television and radio presenter
 26 September
 Emma Rigby, actress
 Kieran Gibbs, English footballer
 Jonny Bairstow, English cricketer
 15 October – Anthony Joshua, boxer
 20 October – Jess Glynne, pop singer-songwriter
 3 November 
 Elliott Tittensor, actor
 Luke Tittensor, actor
 5 November – Andrew Boyce, English footballer
 9 November 
 Jennifer Pike, violinist
 Murugan Thiruchelvam, chess player
 15 November – Joe Westerman, rugby league player
 18 November – Marc Albrighton, English footballer
 21 November – Fabian Delph, English footballer
 26 November – Junior Stanislas, footballer
 27 November – Freddie Sears, footballer
 28 November 
 Claire Brookin, darts player
 Ayesha Gwilt, actress
 Martin Hare, handball player
 12 December – Harry Eden, actor
 15 December – Lady Leshurr, rapper, singer and producer
 18 December – Emily Atack, actress
 Unknown date – Roshonara Choudhry, Islamic terrorist convicted of the attempted murder of MP Stephen Timms

Deaths

 7 January – Frank Adams, mathematician (born 1930)
 18 January – Bruce Chatwin, novelist and travel writer (born 1940)
 27 January
 Arthur Marshall, writer and broadcaster (born 1910)
 Sir Thomas Sopwith, aviation pioneer and yachtsman (born 1888)
 1 February – Sir James Drake, civil engineer (born 1907)
 22 February – Sir Raymond Gower, Conservative Party MP (born 1916)
 6 March – Harry Andrews, actor (born 1911)
 18 March – Sir Harold Jeffreys, mathematician (born 1891)
 22 March – Peta Taylor, cricketer (born 1912)
 23 March – Bob McTaggart, Labour Party MP (born 1945)
 1 April – George Robledo, Chilean-born footballer based in Britain (born 1926)
 10 April – Joan Barry, actress (born 1903; died in Spain)
 12 April – Gerald Flood, actor (born 1927)
 19 April – Dame Daphne du Maurier, novelist (born 1907)
 29 April – Leonard Redshaw, shipbuilder (born 1911)
 19 May – C. L. R. James, writer and journalist (born 1901)
 20 May – John Hicks, economist, Nobel Prize laureate (born 1904)
 26 May – Don Revie, footballer, manager of Leeds United and the England national football team (born 1927)
 14 June – Pete de Freitas, rock musician, drummer with band Echo and the Bunnymen (born 1961)
 27 June – Alfred Ayer, philosopher (born 1910)
 1 July – Dora Gaitskell, widow of Labour Party leader Hugh Gaitskell (born 1901)
 5 July – Berthold Wolpe, German-born calligrapher, typographer and illustrator (born 1905)
 11 July – Laurence Olivier (Lord Olivier), actor, director and producer (born 1907)
 14 July – Frank Bell, linguist and academic (born 1916)
 15 July – Laurie Cunningham, English footballer based in Spain (born 1956)
 23 July – Michael Sundin, Blue Peter presenter (born 1961)
 1 August – John Ogdon, pianist (born 1937)
 10 August – Isabella Forshall, pediatric surgeon (born 1900)
 29 August – Peter Scott, ornithologist, conservationist and painter, son of Captain Robert Falcon Scott (born 1909)
 4 October – Graham Chapman, comedian (born 1941)
 28 October – Henry Hall, bandleader (born 1898) 
 8 November –  Olive Henry, artist (born 1902)
 14 November – Jimmy Murphy, footballer and coach (born 1910)
 24 November – Edward Bawden, artist (born 1903)
 29 November – Gubby Allen, Australian-born England cricketer and cricket administrator (born 1902)
 5 December – John Pritchard, conductor (born 1921)
 10 December – Sam Barkas, footballer (born 1910)
 19 December – Stella Gibbons, novelist, journalist, poet and short-story writer (born 1902)
 28 December – William Scott, Ulster Scots painter (born 1913)

See also

 1989 in British music
 1989 in British television
 List of British films of 1989

References

 
Years of the 20th century in the United Kingdom
United Kingdom